Spilarctia arctichroa is a moth in the family Erebidae. It was described by Herbert Druce in 1909. It is found in Papua and north-western Papua New Guinea. The habitat consists of lowland and mountainous areas.

References

Moths described in 1909
arctichroa